ST3 beta-galactoside alpha-2,3-sialyltransferase 3, also known as ST3GAL3, is a protein which in humans is encoded by the ST3GAL3 gene.

Function 

The protein encoded by this gene is a type II membrane protein that catalyzes the transfer of sialic acid from CMP-sialic acid to galactose-containing substrates. The encoded protein is normally found in the Golgi apparatus but can be proteolytically processed to a soluble form. This protein is a member of glycosyltransferase family 29. Multiple transcript variants encoding several different isoforms have been found for this gene.

Mutations in the ST3GAL3 gene was recently shown to be the cause of autosomal recessive mental retardation 12. Since the mutations disrupt a glycosylation pathway, this disorder may be considered a congenital disorder of glycosylation.

See also 
 Sialyltransferase

References

Further reading